The South Texas National Bank, located at 215 Main Street in Houston, Texas, was listed on the National Register of Historic Places on December 8, 1978.  It was demolished for parking in 1983.

See also
 National Register of Historic Places listings in Harris County, Texas

References

1910 establishments in Texas
1983 disestablishments in Texas
Bank buildings on the National Register of Historic Places in Texas
Buildings and structures in Houston
Commercial buildings completed in 1910
Demolished buildings and structures in Houston
National Register of Historic Places in Houston
Neoclassical architecture in Texas